The 1982 New Mexico gubernatorial election took place on November 2, 1982. Its purpose was to elect the governor of New Mexico. Due to term limits, incumbent Democrat Bruce King was ineligible to seek a second term as governor. As of 2019, this is the last election in which a governor was succeeded by a member of the same party.

Democratic primary
The Democratic primary was won by former attorney general Toney Anaya.

Results

Republican primary
The Republican primary was won by John B. Irick

Results

General election

Results

References

1982
gubernatorial
New Mexico